Benjamin Henry Sheares (12 August 1907 – 12 May 1981) was a Singaporean politician, physician and academic who served as the second president of Singapore from 1971 until his death in 1981.

Sheares retired in 1960 and was in private practice before being elected as the president of Singapore by the Parliament after the death of Yusof Ishak, the former president of the Republic, on 23 November 1970. He was sworn on 2 January 1971. 

Sheares initially wanted to retire after finishing his second term as he felt that he did not have the energy for another term, but Prime Minister Lee Kuan Yew persuaded him and Sheares took on his third term. He served as the president of Singapore for three terms from 2 January 1971 until his death on 12 May 1981.

Both the Benjamin Sheares Bridge and Sheares Hall at the National University of Singapore are named after him.

Early life and education
Sheares was born on 12 August 1907 in Singapore to an Eurasian family with an English lineage. He was the second of six children in the family. His father Edwin H. Sheares, an English technical supervisor of the Public Works Department, and raised in the British Raj. Edwin later married Singapore-born Lilian Gómez, of mixed Chinese and Spanish descent, and had six children—the first died in infancy. Life was hard for the Sheares family with the meagre salary that Edwin received from his post.

As a young child, Sheares was affectionately known as Ben or Bennie. He was a quiet boy who kept much to himself and loved to play at Peirce Reservoir, where his father worked.

He had a close relationship with his sister Alice and often loved to role play doctor with her. On one occasion, he made Alice swallow a one-cent coin as a medical "pill" in their game. Benjamin was six years old then and received a good hiding from his mother Lilian. Throughout his growing years, Benjamin showed ambition to become a doctor—a dream deemed almost impossible for someone who was Asian and came from a poor family in the early colonial days of Singapore. However, Alice continued to spirit him on with that dream, against his mother's wishes for her son to take up a job as a clerk and start helping out with the family bills as soon as he completed his Senior Cambridge Examinations (equivalent to O Level).

Sheares was educated at St. Andrew's School before transferring in 1922 to study at the Raffles Institution, the only school equipped with scientific laboratories—making it an ideal place to further his ambition to become a doctor. In 1923, he enrolled into the King Edward VII College of Medicine (now the National University of Singapore) to begin his medical training. Sheares was aware that his family could not see him through the hefty school fees afforded by the College, therefore he won a generous scholarship offered by the Council of the Medical College with his exemplary academic performance. With this quantum, he was able to give $50 monthly to his mother for the support of his family. He continued to excel in his studies and was awarded four medals by his college. Later, he passed his Obstetrics and Gynaecology (O&G) final examinations with distinctions.

Medical career
Upon graduation, Sheares worked as an obstetrician in the Kandang Kerbau Hospital (now KK Women's and Children's Hospital) and a professor at the University of Malaya. He continued to support his family, and assumed full responsibility for his family when his father died in 1940. Sheares was awarded the Queen's Fellowship which would grant him a two-year postgraduate training in Britain. However, his studies were postponed due to the Second World War. During the war in 1941, the hospital Sheares was working at, was damaged by the bombing from the Japanese military and it was converted into a general hospital for injured civilians.

After the war, Sheares was appointed as an acting professor of Obstetrics and Gynaecology at the hospital, which he held on until he went for his postgraduate studies at the Royal Postgraduate Medical School in 1947. He returned to Singapore in 1948 and returned to his post as acting professor of Obstetrics and Gynaecology at Kandang Kerbau Hospital before he became a full professor in 1950. Sheares then retired from the hospital in 1960 and went into private practice until he was elected as the president of Singapore by the Parliament. He became Honorary Consultant after his retirement and continued teaching both undergraduate and postgraduate students at the hospital.

Personal life
Sheares married Yeo Seh Geok Sheares in 1939 and they had three children together, Constance, Edwin Chin-Hwee and Joseph.

Presidency (1971–1981)
Benjamin Sheares became Singapore's second president on 2 January 1971. His mother was 91 years old when she learnt that her son had become the president of Singapore. Just two weeks before she died, she said "God has blessed Bennie especially after the way he looked after us and me." According to a medical assistant of his, Sheares had possibly donated his entire salary as president to charity.

Sheares served three terms as president from 2 January 1971 until 12 May 1981. He originally wanted to retire after finishing his second term as he felt that he did not have the energy for another term, but Prime Minister Lee Kuan Yew persuaded him and Sheares, aged 70 then, took on his third term as president. Sheares held the office until his death in 1981. Devan Nair succeeded him as president.

Notable contributions
During his time as Head of Obstetrics and Gynaecology at Kandang Kerbau Hospital (now KK Women's and Children's Hospital) during the Japanese occupation, Sheares pioneered the lower Caesarian section which resulted in a lower mortality and morbidity rate in pregnant women than the upper Caesarian section. 

The method is currently the most common Caesarian section method used today. Another one of Sheares' main contributions to medicine was a technique to create an artificial vagina for those born without one. A modification of it is still used for sex change operations today.

Death and legacy

Sheares was found to have tumors in his lung in November 1980 while serving his third term as president. He slipped into a coma on 8 May 1981 and died four days later on the 12th of that month. He was buried at Kranji State Cemetery. 

The Benjamin Sheares Bridge, Sheares Avenue and Sheares Link are named after him. In academia, the student's residence Sheares Hall at the National University of Singapore, Benjamin Henry Sheares Professorship in Obstetrics & Gynaecology, Benjamin Sheares Professorship in Academic Medicine, and the Benjamin Sheares College at the Duke–NUS Graduate Medical School are all named after him.

See also

 President of Singapore
 Benjamin Sheares Bridge

References

Bibliography

1907 births
1981 deaths
Singaporean gynaecologists
Honorary Knights Grand Cross of the Order of the Bath
Presidents of Singapore
Raffles Institution alumni
Singaporean Protestants
Saint Andrew's School, Singapore alumni
Academic staff of the National University of Singapore
Singaporean Christians
Singaporean people of Chinese descent
Singaporean people of English descent
Singaporean people of British descent
Singaporean people of Spanish descent